FTM  may refer to:
 Face the Music (Electric Light Orchestra album), a 1975 album by Electric Light Orchestra
 Faculty of Travel Medicine
 Fair to Midland, an American rock band
 Family Tree Maker, a genealogy program
 Farm-to-market road
 Father Michael Troy Catholic Junior High School, in Edmonton, Alberta, Canada
 Fathom, a unit of length
 Female-to-male, or trans man
 Sex reassignment surgery (female-to-male)
 Field test mode
 First to market 
 Follow-the-moon
 Fort Matilda railway station, in Scotland
 Franco Tosi Meccanica, an Italian engineering firm
 Ford Thailand Manufacturing, an automobile manufacturing plant
 Full-time manual focus
 Full-time mother
 Metalworkers' Federation, a trade union in France
 Trento–Malè–Marilleva railway